Nebraska Family Alliance (NFA) is a fundamentalist Christian organization based in Lincoln, Nebraska. It is a 501(c)(3) organization founded in 1988. It lobbies against gambling, human trafficking, and LGBT rights such as same-sex marriage and LGBT adoption, and advocates for traditional gender roles and family structures, legal restrictions on abortion, and other conservative Christian positions on public policy. 

As a family policy council, the NFA is a state-level affiliate of Focus on the Family. The NFA's stated mission is to "advance family, freedom, and life by influencing policy, mobilizing prayer, and empowering people." The organization has been criticized as discriminatory and some LGBT publications have referred to it as a hate group.

Organization
Nebraska Family Alliance was founded in 1988 as Nebraska Family Council (NFC). Its name changed to the current one when it merged with Family First, another Nebraska-based conservative organization, in 2013.

NFA is a family policy council and aligned with Alliance Defending Freedom, Focus on the Family, and Family Policy Alliance.

Criticism 
Critics of the NFA have viewed the organization as discriminatory, calling it "the lobbying organization that turns Nebraskan conservative Christian fear into law."

Several LGBT publications refer to the organization as a hate group. In an interview, Executive Director Karen Bowling shared that some critics had begun selling t-shirts that read "NFA is a Hate Group."

History of Policy Efforts

Marriage and divorce
In its early days, NFA was focused on opposition to divorce. They supported "making divorces harder to get by increasing the waiting period for them to become final" and other efforts against no-fault divorce.

The NFA opposes gay marriage, calling it a part of the "homosexual agenda"

The organization led the successful 2000 ballot initiative that amended the Nebraska Constitution to prohibit same-sex marriage.
Guyla Mills, organizer of the ballot initiate petition drive and NFA Executive Director, explained her organization's motivation at a January 2001 victory celebration. "We are not hate mongers," she said, addressing protesters on the street outside the celebration venue. "This is not about hate, this is about love. The Defense of Marriage Act movement was just a platform we had to share the love of Jesus Christ."

Intelligent design

NFA advocates for intelligent design, a pseudoscientific explanation of biology, to be included as curriculum in Nebraska schools.

Adoption
From 2000 to 2002, lawyers for the organization fought a court battle against a lesbian couple who were attempting to adopt a child. NFC lawyers won the case, In re Adoption of Luke, in the Nebraska Supreme Court. This set precedent prohibiting gay and unmarried adoption throughout the state.

In 2007, the Nebraska Legislature considered a bill that would allow gay couples to adopt. Executive Director Dave Bydalek testified against the bill, saying "kids are better off with loving parents of both sexes." The measure failed; adoption by same-sex couples was prohibited in Nebraska until 2017.

Domestic assault
The organization opposed a 2004 attempt to modernize Nebraska domestic assault law to use the phrase "intimate partner" to include unmarried couples. Family First Executive Director Dave Bydalek stated "I am aware there are domestic assaults involved in dating, but the public policy of recognizing dating and other types of relationships outside the context of marriage cheapens the importance of marriage in our society." Al Riskowski of Nebraska Family Council said that legally recognizing two people living together is "recognizing an immoral situation. That is not upholding the family."

Human trafficking
NFA has worked to raise awareness about human trafficking and supported the first anti-trafficking law in 2006 that made human-trafficking illegal under Nebraska law. In 2019 NFA supported legislation granting law enforcement the authority to utilize wire-taps in trafficking investigations and to expand the statute of limitations for prosecuting trafficking crimes. NFA also backed legislation in 2018 to allow trafficking victims’ criminal records to be expunged of charges that were a result of trafficking, and in 2017 advocated for a law increasing criminal penalties for trafficking offenses for both traffickers and buyers.

LGBT protections

The organization opposed Nebraska's first attempt to legally prohibit discrimination against LGBT people in 1995, which they viewed as a "homosexual agenda" to silence Christian business.

In 2012, shortly before their merger, Family First and Nebraska Family Council jointly led a successful petition drive against an attempt to ban LGBT employment, housing and public accommodations discrimination in Lincoln. Firing an employee, evicting a renter, and ejecting a customer from a business for reason of sexual orientation remained legal in Lincoln until Bostock v. Clayton County prohibited employment discrimination in 2020.

NFA lobbied in opposition to a series of LGBT anti-discrimination bills in the Nebraska legislature from 2015 to 2019.

The NFA opposes a Lincoln ordinance extending employment and workplace protections to include sexual orientation, gender identity, and active military or veteran status. They collected 18,000 signatures in opposition to it in 2022.

Gambling
NFA opposes state-sponsored gambling and in 2016 helped defeat a ballot initiative attempting to legalize casino gambling.

Fetal alcohol syndrome
NFA also raised awareness about fetal alcohol spectrum disorder and the alcohol-related issues plaguing the Pine Ridge Indian Reservation stemming from the sale of alcohol in the unincorporated village of Whiteclay, Nebraska.

Abortion
They identify as a pro-life organization and support restrictions on abortion. In 2019 NFA advocated for a law requiring abortion providers to inform women seeking a medication abortion about the possibility of continuing their pregnancy after beginning a medication abortion. Such legislation has drawn criticism from professional medical associations. The American College of Obstetricians and Gynecologists issued a fact sheet stating "claims regarding abortion 'reversal' treatment are not based on science and do not meet clinical standards." The American Medical Association filed a lawsuit to block similar legislation from being enacted in North Dakota.

Conversion therapy

The NFA hosts ex-gay speakers at its events. Michael Johnston, who "helps people leave the homosexual lifestyle" gave the keynote at the Day of Family in 2000.

In 2019 NFA testified before the Nebraska Legislature in support of keeping conversion therapy legal in Nebraska. NFA cited the bill's broad definition of conversion therapy that would criminalize self-directed talk-therapy.

Religious freedom

NFA's website says of religious freedom: "Due to the ever increasing size of government and the development of same-sex marriage, this fundamental freedom is at risk." NFA invited Jack Phillips and Barronelle Stutzman to speak at a 2018 fundraiser as exemplars of religious freedom because both had declined to provide wedding services to same-sex couples.

NFA supported legislation in 2017 that passed into law to protect the religious freedom rights of teachers by repealing a decades-old law that prohibited teachers from wearing any religious dress or garb.

NFA also hosts an annual National Day of Prayer event and promotes proclamations recognizing "Religious Freedom Day" in Nebraska.

Notable people

Russ Gronewold, CEO of Bryan Health, former NFA board member.
L. Steven Grasz, a federal judge appointed by Donald Trump in 2017, former NFA board member who resigned from the board in 2017.

References

External links
 Board of Directors from Nebraska Secretary of State

Lobbying organizations in the United States
Politics of Nebraska
Organizations established in 1988
1988 establishments in Nebraska
Evangelical parachurch organizations
Organizations that oppose LGBT rights in the United States
Conservative organizations in the United States
Organizations that combat human trafficking